Paulo Rafael de Oliveira Ramos  or simply  Paulo Ramos  (July 30, 1985 – September 1, 2009), was a Brazilian attacking midfielder who played for Vila Nova, Grêmio and Juventude. He was born in Goiânia.

Death
He died of cardiac arrhythmia on September 1, 2009, in Inhumas, while as part of Vila Nova's squad.

References

Sportspeople from Goiânia
1985 births
2009 deaths
Brazilian footballers
Vila Nova Futebol Clube players
Grêmio Foot-Ball Porto Alegrense players
Esporte Clube Juventude players
Association football midfielders
21st-century Brazilian people